Ole Justesen (born 12 June 1946) is a Danish former sports shooter. He competed at the 1972, 1980 and the 1992 Summer Olympics.

References

External links
 

1946 births
Living people
Danish male sport shooters
Olympic shooters of Denmark
Shooters at the 1972 Summer Olympics
Shooters at the 1980 Summer Olympics
Shooters at the 1992 Summer Olympics
People from Odsherred Municipality
Sportspeople from Region Zealand
20th-century Danish people